Bank Alarm is a 1937 American crime film directed by Louis J. Gasnier and starring Conrad Nagel and Eleanor Hunt in the last of their four film G-Man film series.

Plot
A G-Man (Conrad Nagel) and his girlfriend (Eleanor Hunt) follow a trail of clues left by bank robbers.

Cast
 Conrad Nagel as Alan O'Connor
 Eleanor Hunt as Bobbie Reynolds
 Vince Barnett as Clarence 'Bulb' Callahan
 Wheeler Oakman as Joe Karlotti
 Nat Carr as Yoritz
 Frank Milan as Jerry Turner
 Wilma Francis as Kay O'Connor
 William L. Thorne as Police Inspector J. C. Macy (as William Thorn)
 Charles Delaney as Henchman Duke
 Phil Dunham as Leon Curtis - Bank Clerk (as Philip Dunham)
 Sidney D'Albrook as Coroner (as Syd D'Albrook)
 Pat Gleason as Henchman Barney
 Wilson Benge as Overman - Bank Bookkeeper
 Henry Roquemore as Nevada Sheriff
 Ed Schaefer as Tracy

See also
 Public domain film
 List of American films of 1937
 List of films in the public domain in the United States

References

External links

Youtube streaming film

1937 films
American black-and-white films
1937 romantic drama films
Grand National Films films
1937 crime drama films
American romantic drama films
American crime drama films
1930s English-language films
Films directed by Louis J. Gasnier
1930s American films